Stellaris is a 4X grand strategy video game developed by Paradox Development Studio and published by Paradox Interactive. In Stellaris, players take control of an interstellar civilization on the galactic stage and are tasked with exploring, colonizing, and managing their region of the galaxy, encountering other civilizations that they can then engage in diplomacy, trade, or warfare with. A large part of the game involves dealing with both scripted and emergent events, through which new empires alter the balance of power, powerful crises threaten the galaxy, or event chains tell the story of forgotten empires. It was released worldwide for Windows, macOS, and Linux on May 9, 2016 and for PlayStation 4 and Xbox One as Stellaris: Console Edition on February 26, 2019.

Gameplay
Stellaris is a real-time grand strategy game set in one of several available galaxy types in the distant future. Players play as a government of a species in early stages of interstellar space exploration, right after the invention of faster-than-light (FTL) space travel technology, ready to claim a place as one of "the species of the stars." Depending on several factors, such as the ethics of the civilization and the player's desires, the ultimate goal of the empire can range from galactic conquest, hoarding of resources and technological supremacy, to peaceful coexistence with or absolute destruction of all other sentient life. The player controls ships, including science, construction and military vessels. Combat includes space combat and ground combat and is more centered towards the bigger picture, preparation, and strategy. There are also diplomatic options such as alliances and trade agreements with other races.

The game begins either by picking one of the premade empires or using a player-customized empire/species. The process of creating involves several different choices. The first of these choices involves picking a mixture of positive and negative characteristics ("Traits") that make up their species. Next, the player customizes the empire of their species. In this phase, the player chooses the ethics and civics of their empire (with Ethics and Civics points, respectively) which the ideology the empire has adopted. Ethics give various buffs, restrict certain features (a Spiritualist empire cannot use robots, a Materialistic empire cannot outlaw robots) and governments from being picked (an Authoritarian empire is unable to be a democratic government and vice versa), and change the way information is presented to the player. Players also choose an origin, a kind of backstory for their empire. Origins can include originating from a world ravaged by nuclear warfare or starting with a secondary playable race, such as robots or a strong but unintelligent worker race. These secondary species are created in a similar process to the one previously described.

All ethics, other than the later added Gestalt Consciousness, have normal and fanatic versions which represent the alignment of the empire. Fanatic versions of ethics give greater bonuses than their normal variants, but usually have even higher restrictions and always take up two ethics points instead of the normal one point per ethic. The ethic named Gestalt Consciousness makes the empire a hive mind or robotic empire, takes up all ethics points and gives new civics only available to hive mind and robotic empires. Megacorporations, a government type added in the Megacorp DLC, aren't restricted ethics-wise like a hive mind is, but they can only choose civics unique to them. Both ethics (other than Gestalt Consciousness) and most civics can be changed throughout the game. The player can customize the flag, name, homeworld, appearance of cities and space constructs, and ruler of their empire.

In most cases, the player's empire begins with a single inhabited planet, several mining and/or research stations, a construction ship, a science ship, three small warships, and a starbase. Early gameplay consists of exploring and colonizing increasing swaths of space, while mid-game activities may include engaging with warfare and/or diplomacy with other empires, but can also be filled with a vast amount of micro-management. The economy of a player's empire throughout the game is primarily based on five main resources: energy credits, minerals, food, consumer goods, and alloys, each having a primary purpose to contribute to the player's economy. There are also Strategic resources that are used to make advanced buildings, weapons, defenses, and can also be used to endorse edicts. Edicts also can cost Influence which can be obtained by supporting factions with in your empire or by participating in diplomacy with other empires in your galaxy. Advancement in Stellaris is achieved through technologies and traditions which progressively scale in cost for the player to achieve, but provide better features for the player as the game continues. Edicts are used to boost and passively upgrade empires, costing Strategic resources, energy, and influence. There are also mid-game crises which can occur, such as a crusade by a marauder empire. Later in the game, larger crisis events occur that have galaxy-wide implications—for example, an awakening of dormant sentient AI or an invasion by extra-dimensional or extra-galactic forces, these being either randomly chosen or selected by the player at the start of the game. Paradox hoped that this feature would address a common late-game problem in 4X style games; whereby one faction is so powerful that their eventual victory is inevitable, resulting in frustrating gameplay. In the Nemesis DLC, the player can choose to become the crisis with the goal of destroying the galaxy.

Development and release
Stellaris was developed by Paradox Development Studios and published by Paradox Interactive. The game uses the same Clausewitz Engine that the studio has used since Europa Universalis III in 2007 albeit with some modifications, such as the usage of physically based rendering (PBR). The game was presented at Gamescom in August 2015. Director Henrik Fahraeus describes his influences as "one third Star Control 2, one third Master of Orion 2 and one third Europa Universalis IV", to "create a strategy game with particular focus on exploration and expansion". The team also referenced Star Control II with several character concepts and personalities, including alien races who resemble birds, mushrooms, and gas clouds.

Stellaris was released to the public on May 9, 2016. After launch, the developers confirmed that there would be a number of expansion packs, as well as free updates to address bugs and introduce new gameplay features. The updates were named after famous science fiction writers, including Arthur C. Clarke, Isaac Asimov, Robert A. Heinlein, Iain Banks, Douglas Adams, Ray Bradbury, Karel Čapek, Pierre Boulle, C. J. Cherryh, Larry Niven, Ursula K. Le Guin, Gene Wolfe, Tanith Lee, and Mary Shelley, until 2022, when they began to take the names of constellations starting with 3.3, "Libra".

The game is also accompanied by free patches, which may adjust existing mechanics or add new ones in the same theme as the expansions. The first major patch arrived on May 24, shortly after the game's release, featuring numerous improvements to the AI, as well as an additional playable race. The 2.0 patch (Cherryh), released in February 2018, revamps a significant amount of game mechanics, even for players who have not purchased the corresponding "Apocalypse" DLC. The 2.1 (Niven) update, released alongside the "Distant Stars" DLC in May, revamped the base game play loop and added more quality-of-life features. The 2.2 (Le Guin) update was released in December, along with the "Megacorp" DLC, and revamped how planets are organized. The 3.0 (Dick) update was released in April 2021, coinciding with the release of the "Nemesis" DLC. Minor releases have continued through 2022 with 3.5 being released September 2022.

There have also been plenty of story packs and species packs that have been released, each adding a new in game events, origins, empire types, species, traits, civic, and ascension perks. Plantoids Species Pack dropped August 4 2016 being the first, and the latest being the Toxoids Species Pack releasing September 20 2022.

Paradox ported the game to consoles. The PlayStation 4 and Xbox One versions of Stellaris were released on February 26, 2019, as Stellaris: Console Edition. A version of the game optimized for Xbox Series X/S released on March 25, 2021.

Downloadable Content

A number of DLCs have been released for the game. All are optional and may be applied to the base game in any combination. The largest DLCs come in the form of expansions, which significantly alter the mechanics and features of the game. There are also story packs (which add new events and minor mechanics) and species packs (which add new species, with accompanying audio, visuals and mechanics).

Reception

Pre-release 
In a preview of the game at Rock, Paper, Shotgun, Adam Smith wrote that Stellaris "could be Paradox's finest hour, and a landmark in the development of both 4X and grand strategy design".

Critical response 
Stellaris received "generally favorable" reviews, according to review aggregator Metacritic. A number of reviews emphasized the game's approachable interface and design, along with a highly immersive and almost RPG-like early game heavily influenced by the player's species design decisions, and also the novelty of the end-game crisis events. The more mixed reviews also noted that the mid-game could be less satisfying, thanks to an overly simple diplomatic system and a somewhat passive AI.

Sales 
Less than 24 hours after release, Paradox Interactive announced that Stellaris had sold over 200,000 units, breaking the revenue record for any of Paradox Interactive's previous titles during the same time period. It almost matched the sales record currently held by Cities: Skylines. It became Paradox Development Studio's fastest selling game. On 21 June 2016, the game had sold over 500,000 units. On 12 May 2020, the publisher announced a new record for total players online, with the game's sales exceeding 3 million units.

See also

List of grand strategy video games 
List of Paradox Interactive games 
List of PC games

References

External links
 
 Official wiki
 

2016 video games
4X video games
Grand strategy video games
Linux games
MacOS games
Paradox Interactive games
PlayStation 4 games
Science fiction video games
Space opera video games
Video games with Steam Workshop support
Video games about extraterrestrial life
Video games about space warfare
Video games developed in Sweden
Video games set in the 22nd century
Video games set on fictional planets
Video games using procedural generation
Video games with downloadable content
Windows games
Xbox Cloud Gaming games
Xbox One games
Artificial wormholes in fiction
Xenoarchaeology in fiction